Furuset Aktivitetspark (literally Furuset Activity Park) is a park in the neighborhood of Furuset in Oslo, Norway. It opened in November 2008. It was created as part of an initiative to develop the Grorud Valley under the auspices of Oslo Municipality and the national authorities.

Facilities include climbing nets, roundabouts, fitness equipment, a 40 x 60 metre (130 x 200 ft) soccer pitch with artificial grass, a beach volleyball court, a gravel running track, a circular labyrinth, and a playground. In winter there is a skating rink where it is possible to rent ice skates.

References

Parks in Oslo